Hohenschwangau is a former village and now an urban district of the municipality of Schwangau, Ostallgäu district, Bavaria, Germany.

It is located between Schloss Neuschwanstein and Schloss Hohenschwangau and is visited by about 2 million people annually, where they start tours to the former royal palaces.
The village is dominated by car parks, restaurants, guesthouses, hotels and souvenir shops.

Hohenschwangau is bordered by the Alpsee in the West. Here the Museum of the Bavarian Kings was established in 2011 in a former ancient hotel building (Alpseestraße 27). 

The actress and singer Helen Vita was born in Hohenschwangau. Julien Duvivier shot exterior scenes of one of his films, Marianne de ma jeunesse, on the location.

External links
 Hohenschwangau Village

Villages in Bavaria
Ostallgäu